Gliese 54 (GJ 54 / HIP 5496 / LHS 1208) is a star near the Solar System located at 25.7 light years away. It is located in the constellation of Tucana, close to the edge, almost in the neighboring Hydrus. It is below the threshold brightness to be observable eye with an apparent magnitude of +9.80,.

Gliese 54 is a red dwarf of spectral type M2 with an effective temperature of 4250 K.
In the SIMBAD database it appears listed as variable star, getting the provisional variable designation NSV 427.
It has a companion with which it forms a binary system whose orbital period is 427 ± 9 days. The companion, a red dwarf whose brightness is ~1 magnitude lower than Gliese 54, has been resolved with the instrument NICMOS installed in the Hubble Space Telescope.

The known stars closer to Gliese 54 are ζ Tucanae, solar analog 3.1 light years, and β Hydri 5.1 light years

See also 
 List of nearest stars and brown dwarfs

References

Durchmusterung objects
0054
Binary stars
Tucana (constellation)
005496
M-type main-sequence stars
J01102281-6726425